Sharna is a feminine given name. Notable people with the name include:

Sharna Bass (born 1997), English singer
Sharna Burgess (born 1985), Australian ballroom dancer
Sharna Fernandez, South African politician

Feminine given names